Lower Saxony is a component state of the Federal Republic of Germany established in 1946.

Lower Saxony may also refer to: 

 Saxe-Lauenburg (1260/1296–1876), a component duchy of the Holy Roman Empire, the German Confederation, the North German Confederation, and the German Empire, commonly called Lower Saxony between the 14th and 17th centuries
 Lower Saxon Circle (1500–1806), a tax levying and army recruitment district and constituency of the Holy Roman Empire

See also
 Low Saxon (disambiguation)